The First National Bank Building is a 417-foot-tall high-rise building in downtown Saint Paul, Minnesota, United States. The building has the tallest connecting skyway in the Twin Cities.

Construction
The first building on the property, the Merchants Bank Building, was built in 1915 and opened in 1916. Rising 228 feet tall and with 16 stories, the building was the tallest in Saint Paul until it was overtaken by the Wells Fargo Place. The First National Bank Building was designed by Graham, Anderson, Probst & White in 1931 after Merchants National Bank was absorbed by First National Bank. The 32 story structure struggled to acquire materials in 1930 due to the construction of the Empire State Building at the same time. In 1932 the cost of the building was $3,340,185.44.

Building

Skyway

It is believed that the world's first modern skyway was built to connect the two towers.
The skyway connects the building's 17th floor with the adjacent 16-story Merchants Bank Building which is part of the same property. It is the tallest skyway in the Twin Cities. The skyway with six tinted windows was built in 1931 in conjunction of the finishing of the building. The Merchants Bank Building was the tallest in Saint Paul from 1915 to 1931 when the First National Bank Building overtook it.

Sign
The building is probably most known for the large neon red "1st" sign atop the building. The sign has three sides and rises four stories to a height of fifty feet. In 1973 the sign was turned off in response to the energy crisis. The sign was relighted ten years later after a major renovation. The original "vermillion vitreous porcelain edged [sign] with a double row of red neon tubes" was replaced with solely red tubes. Around four thousand feet of neon tubing was used in the renovation. The sign can be seen from almost 75 miles away from the air at night and 20 miles away on a clear day. After renovation in 2016 due to wind damage, the sign was relit, with a color changing LED sign. For the Winter Carnival in 2017, the sign changed color from neon red to icy blue.  In 2017, the sign was changed to purple, during the first anniversary of musician Prince's death.

Building
The building is eligible for the National Register of Historic Places but not currently listed. The building's overall design is Art Deco. The building was the tallest in Saint Paul from its construction in 1931 till 1986 when Galtier Plaza (now Cray Plaza) overtook the building, a total of 55 years.  The building is currently the third tallest in Saint Paul behind Jackson Tower of Cray Plaza and Wells Fargo Place (formerly the Minnesota World Trade Center).

The building was sold in January 2007 to First National Building Holdings for an undisclosed amount. The building was then sold in 2012 to an unknown organization. Three years later the building was sold to Madison Equities of St. Paul.

See also
List of tallest buildings in St. Paul

References

External links

Official website

Skyscraper office buildings in Saint Paul, Minnesota
Art Deco architecture in Minnesota
Office buildings completed in 1931